"Sora" (空 / sky), is a Japanese-language song by female duo Soulhead, and their third single under Sony Music Entertainment Japan. It managed to reach #28 on the Oricon charts and charted for six weeks.

Information
Sora is an R&B song by Soulhead under SMEJ. It contained the title track and a remix to their debut song, Step to the New World; the remix was done by Octopussy, who Soulhead would work closely with throughout their career. Sora also received a remix on their first remix album, Re-Construct Album Vol.1 Reflection.

Sora was released as both a CD and 12" vinyl.

Track listing

CD
"Sora"
"Step to the New World" (Remix)
"Sora" (Instrumental)

12"
Side A
"Sora"
"Sora" (Instrumental)
"Sora" (A Capella)
Side B
"Step to the New World" (Remix)
"Step to the New World" (Remix Instrumental)
"Step to the New World" (Original Mix)

Charts and sales

References

2003 singles
2003 songs
Sony Music Entertainment Japan singles
Soulhead songs